Yuri Simões (born June 18, 1990) is a Brazilian grappler, BJJ practitioner and mixed martial artist, signed with Singapore-based mixed martial arts promotion ONE Championship. He is a three time ADCC World Champion in three different weight divisions.

Background
Simões started training judo at the age of four, transitioning to Brazilian jiu-jitsu at the age of nine. He received his black belt from Ricardo Vieira in 2011, and in 2013 he changed teams to train under Caio Terra.

Martial arts career

Grappling career
Simões won his first ADCC medal in 2015, when he won the 2015 ADCC 88 kg gold medal. During the tournament, he managed to beat Keenan Cornelius, Romulo Barral, Zbigniew Tyszka and Ricardo Mesquita. He took part in the 2017 edition of the ADCC as well, competing in the 99 kg weight category. Yuri beat Roman Dolidze by points in the opening round, Mike Perez by decision in the quarterfinals, Jackson Sousa by points in the semifinals and Felipe Pena by points in the finals, to once again win the gold medal.

Simões also won four gold medals in the World No-Gi Brazilian Jiu-Jitsu Championship, winning the gold medal in both his and the absolute weight categories, in both 2014 and 2016. Simões won his third ADCC title, this time in Absolute after defeating Lachlan Giles, Nick Rodriguez, Roberto Abreu and Nicholas Meregali in the final of the 2022 ADCC World Championship.

Mixed martial arts
Having begun training martial arts several years prior, he announced in August 2020 that he had signed with ONE Championship. His first fight was announced for ONE Championship: Inside the Matrix 3, where was scheduled take on Fan Rong on November 13, 2020. Yuri lost his promotional debut by unanimous decision.

He is scheduled to face Daniyal Zainalov at ONE: Full Circle on February 25, 2022. Simões lost by split decision.

After suffering two straight losses to start his MMA career, he was released by ONE.

Mixed martial arts record

|-
| Loss
| align=center| 0–2
| Daniyal Zainalov
| Decision (split)
| ONE: Full Circle
| 
| align=center|3
| align=center|5:00
| Kallang, Singapore
|  
|-
| Loss
| align=center| 0–1
| Fan Rong 
| Decision (unanimous)
| ONE Championship: Inside the Matrix 3
| 
| align=center|3
| align=center|5:00
| Kallang, Singapore
|  
|-

References

External links
 
 Yuri Simões highlights
 
 

1990 births
Living people
Brazilian male mixed martial artists
Mixed martial artists utilizing Brazilian jiu-jitsu
Brazilian practitioners of Brazilian jiu-jitsu
People awarded a black belt in Brazilian jiu-jitsu
Sportspeople from Rio de Janeiro (city)
ADCC Submission Fighting World Champions (men)